The 1926 United States Senate special election in North Dakota took place on June 30, 1926. On June 22, 1925, Republican Senator Edwin F. Ladd died in office. Governor Arthur G. Sorlie appointed Gerald Nye, a former congressional candidate and a prominent progressive activist, to fill Ladd's vacancy. A special election and regularly scheduled election were scheduled for the same year, though the special election, to fill the remaining months Ladd's term, took place months before the regularly scheduled election. 

Nye won the endorsement of the Nonpartisan League and rejected any efforts by the state Republican Party to nominate him. Meanwhile, the Democratic Party opted not to run a candidate, instead fusing with the Republicans to support the anti-Nonpartisan League campaign of former Governor Louis B. Hanna. Separately, C. P. Stone, a businessman, ran as an Independent Republican candidate. All of the nominations were conducted under conventions, not primaries, because the election was a special election. Ultimately, Nye won a full term over his opponents by a healthy margin, winning 50% of the vote to Hanna's 37% and Stone's 12%.

General election

Results

References

North Dakota 1926
North Dakota 1926
1926 Special
North Dakota Special
United States Senate Special
United States Senate 1926